Charlie, Charley or Charles Chase may refer to:

Charles L. Chase (1828—after 1877), American politician from Minnesota
Charles A. Chase (1864–1937), American tennis champion
Charley Chase (1893–1940), American comedy actor, screenwriter and film director
Charles Chase (boxer) (1931–1997), Canadian Olympic light middleweight
Charlie Chase (broadcaster) (born 1952), American radio and television host (Crook & Chase)
DJ Charlie Chase (born 1959), American DJ; key supporter of Puerto Rican music and culture

See also
Charlie Hall Chase, English horse race established in 1969